Chelers is a commune in the Pas-de-Calais department in the Hauts-de-France region of France.

Geography
A farming village located 13 miles (22 km) west-northwest of Arras at the junction of the D77 with the D72 road.

Population

Places of interest
 The church of St.Martin, dating from the eighteenth century.
 The Commonwealth War Graves Commission cemetery.
 An eighteenth-century chateau.

See also
Communes of the Pas-de-Calais department

References

External links

 The CWGC graves

Communes of Pas-de-Calais